The Southern Bloc of the Revolutionary Armed Forces of Colombia was the first bloc to exist and is where the roots of the guerrilla movement lie.  The bloc has been held responsible for several notorious attacks, including the infamous "donkey-bomb", numerous attacks against military bases, as well as Íngrid Betancourt´s kidnapping.  It was also blamed by government investigators and prosecutors for the bombing of the El Nogal club. FARC itself denied that any of its members were responsible for the attack.

The bloc operates in much of the area that borders with Ecuador and Peru, with some supposed incursions into foreign territory.  The government suspects that many FARC leaders may be hiding in the jungles protected by the South Bloc.

The specific divisions of the group are arguable. Because of the current conflict existing in the country, much of the information recovered is conflicting and cannot be taken as absolutely reliable. Some of the believed divisions or 'fronts', as they are commonly called, are shown below. Many of these fronts sometimes work together towards a certain mission, while others are further divided into 'columns' and 'companies' with a smaller number of members.  For more general information see FARC-EP Chain of Command.

Commanders

2nd Front 

Also known as the Isaías Pardo Front, up to 120 militants form it.  It operates mostly in the Nariño Department and the Caquetá Department.

3rd Front (dismantled) 

Up to 100 militants form this front that operates mostly in the Caquetá Department and the Huila Department.  Its current leadership is unclear.

13th Front 

Up to 150 militants form this front that operates mostly in the Caquetá Department and the Huila Department.

14th Front 

Up to 250 militants form this front that operates mostly in the Caquetá Department.  It is considered one of the most important fronts of the Southern Bloc.

15th Front 

Also known as the José Ignacio Mora Front, around 300 militants and 2,000 non-combatants form it.  It operates mostly in the Caquetá Department.  The group is considered responsible for Íngrid Betancourt´s kidnapping. In March 2012, the group was held responsible for taking a French journalist, Roméo Langlois, as an hostage during an attack in which 4 Colombian soldiers were killed. Langlois was released a month later.

32nd Front 

Up to 170 militants form this front that operates mostly in the Putumayo Department and the Caquetá Department.

48th Front 

Also known as the Antonio José de Sucre, up to 450 militants form it.  It operates mostly in the Putumayo Department.  The group is very active in the border with Ecuador and was suspected of sheltering Raúl Reyes before his death in a Colombian cross border raid on 01 March 2008.

On September 19, 2010, the National Police reported the death of more than 20 guerrilla combatants from this front.

On November 15, 2010, 17 body of suspected FARC members were recovered after Colombia Forces carried out a bombing in FARC 48th front. Two suspected member were children, probably kidnapped by FARC: 12-year-old Jimmy Lee, a Colombian refugee in Ecuador, and 15-year-old Doris Carolina Cadena Benarcazar, an Ecuadorian citizen from Carchi Province. Ecuador denounces the recruitment of Ecuadorean minors into the ranks of Colombia's FARC guerrilla group.

49th Front 

Around 50 to 100 militants form this front that operates in the Cauca and Caquetá Departments.

61st Front 

Also known as the Timanco Front, up to 70 militants form it.  It operates mostly in the Huila Department.

Mobile Column Teófilo Forero 

As of 2013, at least 220 specialized militants form this powerful group that operates mostly in the Huila Department and the Caquetá Department, with much urban activity around the country.

Mobile Column Yesid Ortiz 

According to the Colombian newspaper El Tiempo, the Yesid Ortiz Mobile Column was created by fusing remnants of the Teofilo Forero Mobile Column, the 3rd and 14th fronts into a single group which were weakened by the Military of Colombia as part of the Plan Patriota. The main objective of this unit according to El Tiempo is to recover lost territory in the Department of Caqueta.

Medical Commission

See also

References 

FARC